Jackson Kench (born 19 March 1999) is an Australian representative rower. He has represented at underage and senior world championships and won a bronze medal at the 2022 World Championships.

Club and state rowing
Kench was educated at Sydney Church of England Grammar School where he took up rowing. His Australian senior club rowing has been from the Sydney University Boat Club.

Kench first made state selection for New South Wales in the 2018 men's youth eight which contested and won the Noel F Wilkinson Trophy at the Interstate Regatta within the Australian Rowing Championships.  He made a second New South Wales youth eight appearance in 2019.

In 2022 Kench moved into the New South Wales senior eight which won the King's Cup at the Interstate Regatta within the Australian Rowing Championships

International representative rowing
Kench made his Australian representative debut in a quad scull at the 2016 World Junior Rowing Championships in Rotterdam. They finished twelfth overall. The following year Kench was again in the Australian quad at the Junior World Championships in Trakai. They finished ninth. Kench moved into the U23 Australian men's eight in 2019, racing in that boat to a sixth place finish at the 2019 U23 World Rowing Championships in Sarasota, Florida.

In March 2022 Kench was selected in the Australian senior training team to prepare for the 2022 international season and the 2022 World Rowing Championships. He rowed in the Australian men's eight to silver medal placings at each of the World Rowing Cups in June and July 2022. At the 2022 World Rowing Championships at Racize, Kench moved into the stroke seat of the eight. The crew won through their repechage to make the A final where they raced to a third place and a World Championship bronze medal.

References

External links

1999 births
Living people
Australian male rowers
People educated at Sydney Church of England Grammar School
World Rowing Championships medalists for Australia
21st-century Australian people